Littlefield may refer to:

Jurisdictions in the United States
 Littlefield, Arizona
 Littlefield, Texas
 Littlefield Township, Michigan

Other 
Littlefield (surname)
 Institutions:
 In Arizona (in or near town of Littlefield): Littlefield Unified School District
 In Texas:
 In or near city of Austin:
Littlefield Fountain
 Littlefield House
 In or near town of Littlefield in Lamb County:
 Littlefield Municipal Airport
 Littlefield Independent School District

See also 
 Littleton (disambiguation)